Theodoros Roussopoulos (born 13 September 1963) is a Greek politician. He was Minister of State and Government Spokesman from 7 March 2004 until 23 October 2008, as well as one of Prime Minister Kostas Karamanlis's closest aides. Theodoros Roussopoulos was born on 13 September 1963, in Kyparissia, Messenia.

Studies 
He studied at the Laboratory of Professional Journalism (Εργαστήρι Επαγγελματικής Δημοσιογραφίας), before continuing with a course in Journalism at the Oxford Academy. He is a graduate of the Hellenic Open University, where he attended the Department for the Study of Greek Culture of the Faculty of Humanities. He is a PhD graduate to The University of Edinburgh since 2014. His dissertation in history is about the ethnic identity of the Greeks in Venice. Identity Disputes and Politics at the End of The 17th Century is its title.

Career in Journalism 
His journalism career begin in 1981 in the daily newspaper Eleftherotypia, where he remained until 1994. During this time, he also contributed to the monthly Elle magazine. He is a founding member of Mega Channel TV station, for which he worked from 1989 to 1999 as an editor in chief and political analyst. He also produced the "7+7" documentary program. From 1987 to 1989, he contributed to Athena 98.4 FM radio station as a founding member and, in 1999, to Star Channel TV station. He has also contributed from 1994 to 1999 to Messimvrini newspaper and Kathimerini newspaper as an analyst. In 1987 he was a member of the committee of ethics at "Piraeus Channel 1" and he is currently a publisher at Enastron publications.

He is the recipient of the annual award from the "Botsis Foundation" for journalism as well as the friendship award from the Union of Turkish Journalists for the "Best European Television Program".

Political career 
His political career began in 2000 with his appointment as New Democracy Spokesman and Press Representative. After the 2004 general election, he was appointed as Minister of State and Government Spokesman by incoming Prime Minister Kostas Karamanlis.

As Minister of State, Roussopoulos was responsible for the Secretariat General of Communication and the Secretariat General of Information, which, since its abolition in 2004, incorporated the functions of Ministry of the Press and Mass Media.

In addition to his committee assignments, Rousopoulos has been a member of the Greek delegation to the Parliamentary Assembly of the Council of Europe (PACE) since 2019. In the Assembly, he serves on the Committee on Migration, Refugees and Displaced Persons (since 2019); the Sub-Committee on Refugee and Migrant Children and Young People (since 2022); the Sub-Committee on Diasporas and Integration (since 2022); the Sub-Committee on Migrant Smuggling and Trafficking in Human Beings (since 2022); and the Sub-Committee on Education, Youth and Sport (since 2019).

Career in Academics 
From 1997 to 1999 he taught “Television & Politics: the debates between presidential candidates of parties and prime ministers” at the University of Athens as a teaching associate. Since 2009, he is a Lecturer at the Pepperdine University of California and he currently teaches Journalism as an adjunct professor at the European University of Cyprus since 2015.

Publications 

 2013 The Ethnic Identity of the Greeks in Venice, Proceedings of the Paris Conference for Identity issues
 2006 Introduction and text selection in: The fascination of ideas. Athens: Exantas 
 2002 Liberalism and Mass Media: a historic account and contemplation on the freedom of the press, in: On Liberalism. Athens: Constantinos Karamanlis Institute, pp. 359–379
 1996 Writer and reviewer of the journal: “Expression, Communication and Law”

Personal life
He is married to the journalist Mara Zacharea (Μάρα Ζαχαρέα) and has two children, Vasilis and Anna.

References

External links
Secretariat General of Communication/Secretariat General of Information profile
Athens News Agency profile
Παραιτήθηκε ο Ρουσόπουλος

1963 births
Living people
People from Kyparissia
Alumni of the University of Edinburgh
New Democracy (Greece) politicians
Greek MPs 2004–2007
Greek MPs 2007–2009
Greek journalists
Ministers of State (Greece)
Greek MPs 2019–2023